Les Ventes is a commune in the Eure department in the Normandy region in Northern France. In 2018, it had a population of 1,036.

In World War II, American pilot Lt. Billie D. Harris died after crashing in combat near the town (deliberatly avoiding houses and causing no victims among the villagers). Since his death the town has memorialised him; he was initially buried there and the main town square was named after him. His widow, Peggy, was unaware of his status until 2005, as she thought he had gone missing and had not been found.

Population

See also
Communes of the Eure department

References

Communes of Eure
Eburovices